BMR may refer to:

British Music Rights, a subsidiary of UK Music
Balanced Mode Radiator,  a hybrid loudspeaker using distributed mode (DML) technology
Basal metabolic rate, the amount of daily energy expended by humans and other animals at rest
Bayesian model reduction, a statistical method for computing the evidence and parameters of models
Pegaso BMR, a 6x6 wheeled armoured personnel carrier produced in Spain
Big Money Rustlas, a 2010 comedy film starring Detroit hip hop group Insane Clown Posse
Bureau of Mineral Resources, Geology and Geophysics, an earlier name for Geoscience Australia's 
Bare-metal restore, a technique in data recovery
Bad Moon Rising (disambiguation)
Big Machine Records,  an American independent record label specializing in country music artists
Buffalo Metro Rail, the primary mass transit system in Buffalo, New York
BMR Group, a Canadian chain of hardware stores.
Bill McAnally Racing, a NASCAR K&N Pro Series West team.
Brecon Mountain Railway, a  narrow gauge tourist railway in Wales